Děvče za výkladem is a 1937 Czechoslovak film directed by Miroslav Cikán. It stars Hana Vítová, Helena Bušová, and Zdeněk Hora.

Cast
Hana Vítová as Inka
Helena Bušová as Bozka
Zdeněk Hora as Ferda
Milka Balek-Brodská as Simunkova
Antonín Bukový as Film Lighting Man
Bedřich Frank as Policeman
Marie Hallerová 
Ladislav Hemmer as Film Director

References

External links
Děvče za výkladem at the Internet Movie Database

1937 films
Films directed by Miroslav Cikán
Czech romantic drama films
Czechoslovak black-and-white films
1930s Czech films